The Primetime Emmy Award for Sound Editing for a Comedy or Drama Series (One-Hour) is an award handed out annually at the Creative Arts Emmy Awards. Prior to 1976 and between 1979 and 1983, regular series competed with limited series and movies for Outstanding Achievement in Film Sound Editing. In 2018, the category was split to separately recognize one-hour and half-hour series.

In the following list, the first titles listed in gold are the winners; those not in gold are nominees, which are listed in alphabetical order. The years given are those in which the ceremonies took place:



Winners and nominations
Outstanding Achievement in Film Sound Editing

1970s

Outstanding Achievement in Film Sound Editing for a Single Episode of a Regular or Limited Series

Outstanding Achievement in Film Sound Editing for a Series

1980s

Outstanding Sound Editing for a Series

1990s

2000s

2010s

2020s

Individuals with multiple awards

8 awards
 Casey J. Crabtree

6 awards
 David Klotz
 Jeffrey Wilhoit
 Bill Wistrom 

5 awards
 Jeff Charbonneau
 Michael Crabtree
 Doug Grindstaff
 Thomas A. Harris
 Mace Matiosian
 Walter Newman
 Brett Voss
 James Wolvington

4 awards
 Rick Camera
 Wilson Dyer
 Darleen Stoker
 Dylan Tuomy-Wilhoit
 Darren Wright

3 awards
 Pembrooke Andrews
 Michael Baber
 James Bailey
 Zane D. Bruce
 Bradley C. Katona
 Timothy A. Cleveland
 Benjamin L. Cook
 Paul J. Diller
 William Dotson
 Paula Fairfield
 Tony Garber
 Jessica Goodwin
 Tim Hands
 Craig Henighan
 Rick Hromadka
 Al Kajita
 Shawn Kennelly
 Tim Kimmel
 Michael E. Lawshe
 Laura Macias
 Chris McGeary
 Vince Nicastro 
 Richard Raderman 
 Joe Sabella
 Gerry Sackman
 Hank Salerno
 Larry Singer
 Cathie Speakman
 Jeffrey R. Whitcher

2 awards
 William Andrews
 Paul Bercovitch
 Susan Cahill
 Stuart Calderon
 Marko A. Costanzo 
 Thierry J. Couturier
 Don Crosby
 Mark Dennis
 Catherine Flynn
 Karyn Foster
 George Fredrick
 Sharyn Gersh
 Tiffany S. Griffth
 Eileen Horta 
 Samuel Horta
 Don V. Isaacs
 Constance A. Kazmer
 Marvin I. Kosberg
 Ira Leslie
 Maciek Malish
 John Matter
 James Moriana
 Bradley North
 Jeffrey A. Pitts
 Christopher B. Reeves
 Allan K. Rosen
 Fred Rosenberg
 Debby Ruby-Winsberg
 John Stacy
 Josef von Stroheim
 Tim Tuchrello
 Steven Visscher
 Bob Weatherford 
 Susan Welsh
 David Werntz
 Jordan Wilby
 Michael D. Wilhoit

Programs with multiple awards

4 awards
 ER
 Star Trek: The Next Generation
 Stranger Things

3 awards
 Game of Thrones
 Hill Street Blues
 Smallville
 24

2 awards
 Black Sails
 Boardwalk Empire
 The X-Files

Programs with multiple nominations
Totals combined for programs also nominated for Sound Editing for a Comedy or Drama Series (Half-Hour) and Animation.

11 nominations
 ER

8 nominations
 Game of Thrones

7 nominations
 CSI: Crime Scene Investigation
 Star Trek: The Next Generation
 24

6 nominations
 Smallville
 The X-Files

5 nominations
 Boardwalk Empire
 Hill Street Blues

4 nominations
 Black Sails
 Breaking Bad
 Gotham
 Lost
 Stranger Things
 Third Watch
 The Walking Dead

3 nominations
 Airwolf
 Better Call Saul
 CSI: Miami
 Hunter
 Northern Exposure
 Quantum Leap
 Star Trek: Discovery
 Westworld
 Wiseguy

2 nominations
 Alias
 Battlestar Galactica
 Beauty and the Beast
 Dr. Quinn, Medicine Woman
 Homeland
 Law & Order
 MacGyver
 The Mandalorian
 Marvel's Daredevil
 Miami Vice
 Nikita
 Police Story
 Ripley's Believe It or Not!
 St. Elsewhere
 Star Trek: Picard
 Star Trek: Voyager
 Supernatural
 True Blood
 Twin Peaks
 The Undersea World of Jacques Cousteau
 Vikings

Notes

References

Sound Editing for a Comedy or Drama Series (One-Hour)